Acacia veronica, commonly known as Veronica's wattle, is a shrub or tree of the genus Acacia and the subgenus Plurinerves that is endemic to a small area of south western Australia.

Description
Like most species of Acacia it has phyllodes rather than true leaves. It blooms from March to September and produces white-cream flowers.

Taxonomy
The specie was first formally described by the botanist Bruce Maslin in 1989 as a part of the work Acacia veronica Maslin (Leguminosae: Mimosoideae), a new species of Acacia endemic in the Stirling Range, Western Australia as described in the journal Nuytsia. In 2003 it was reclassified by Leslie Pedley as Racosperma veronicae then transferred back to genus Acacia in 2006. It is thought to be reasonably closely related to Acacia spongolitica but not to other species found in Western Australia, it also appears similar in appearance to Acacia cyclops.

Distribution
It is native to an area in the Great Southern region of Western Australia where it is commonly situated in sheltered sites near summits and in gullies along creeks and streams. The range of the plant is contained within the Stirling Range National Park as a part of Eucalyptus marginata - Corymbia calophylla or Eucalyptus wandoo woodlands or forest communities.

See also
 List of Acacia species

References

veronica
Acacias of Western Australia
Taxa named by Bruce Maslin
Plants described in 1989